Edgewood is a passenger rail station on the Northeast Corridor serving the unincorporated community of Edgewood, Maryland. MARC Penn Line trains regularly service the station, along with just one Amtrak train — southbound Northeast Regional train  111 — which stops to receive MARC passengers.

Edgewood station serves the southern terminus of Maryland Route 755 which terminates at an entrance to the Aberdeen Proving Ground. Parking is available on both sides of the tracks. The station is also located east of Amtrak's Edgewood Interlocking Tower, previously owned by the Pennsylvania Railroad.

Station layout
The station has two side platforms and a small station house north of the tracks. Parking is located on either side of the station area. 

No track is designated as "Track 1" at the station; the tracks are numbered in accordance with the former Pennsylvania Railroad's convention of retaining track numbers relative to their position in a four-track main line.

Former station depot 
The former Edgewood station of the Pennsylvania Railroad was designed by architect Lester C. Tichy in association with designer Raymond Loewy. Historic photographs and architectural drawings of the Edgewood station can be found in the March 1943 issue of The Architectural Forum magazine.

References

External links

 Edgewood Road entrance from Google Maps Street View
Edgewood MARC Station (Road and Rail Pictures)

Stations on the Northeast Corridor
MARC Train stations
Former Amtrak stations in Maryland
Penn Line
Transportation buildings and structures in Harford County, Maryland
Railway stations in the United States opened in 1991